Protionamide (or prothionamide) is a drug used in the treatment of tuberculosis.

It has also been tested for use in the treatment of leprosy.

References

Pyridines
Thioamides
Anti-tuberculosis drugs